Desmond Harrington (born October 19, 1976) is an American actor. He has appeared in The Hole (2001), Ghost Ship (2002), and Wrong Turn (2003), Desmond joined the cast of the Showtime series  Dexter in its third season, as Det. Joseph "Joey" Quinn, and is also known for portraying Jack Bass, the uncle of Chuck Bass on Gossip Girl.

Life and career
Harrington was born in Savannah, Georgia, and raised in The Bronx, New York.  His first role was Aulon in Luc Besson's The Messenger: The Story of Joan of Arc (1999).  He soon afterward nabbed prominent roles in films such as The Hole (2001), Ghost Ship (2002), and Wrong Turn (2003).  Harrington also appeared in the Steven Spielberg sci-fi drama Taken, in which he played Jesse Keys, an abductee of aliens. 

In September 2008, he joined the cast of the Showtime TV show Dexter as Detective Joseph "Joey" Quinn.

In December 2008, he played a guest role on Gossip Girl playing Jack Bass. He reprised his role through guest appearances in season three of the show.

In January 2012, it was reported that Harrington would return to Gossip Girl in the "last third of the season". In the same month, he made a guest appearance in the season three premiere of Justified, playing Fletcher "The Ice Pick" Nix.
He also played a small role in The Dark Knight Rises (2012) as a police officer and had a role in the Nicolas Winding Refn 2016 thriller film The Neon Demon.

In 2018, he joined the cast of Elementary as Michael, a serial killer and fellow member of Narcotics Anonymous with Sherlock Holmes.

Filmography

Film

Television

Awards

References

External links

Harrington Daily

1976 births
Male actors from New York (state)
American male film actors
American male television actors
Living people
Actors from Savannah, Georgia
People from the Bronx
20th-century American male actors
21st-century American male actors